Hercynia may refer to: 

Hercynians
The Hercynian Forest
A range of mountains mentioned in several classical sources, in apparently various regions of Europe
, a journal published  by the Universities and Landesbibliothek of Sachsen-Anhalt, which covers ecology and environmental biology
Hercynia, possibly an early Celtic toponym; see Perkwunos
458 Hercynia, an asteroid
Hercynia, a junior synonym of the ant genus Wasmannia

See also 
 Hyrcania (disambiguation)
 Hercynian orogeny, a synonym for the Variscan orogeny of the Carboniferous
 Hercynian massifs, part of the Massif Central of France